The Medal "For Work in Agriculture" is a state decoration of the Russian Federation aimed at recognising merit and achievement within the agro-industrial complex.

Award history 
The Medal "For Work in Agriculture" was established by Presidential Decree № 335 of March 10, 2004.  This decree detailed the medal's statute (award criteria) and appearance.  Presidential decree № 1099 of September 7, 2010 amended the entire Russian awards system away from the distinctions of the Soviet Era, this included changes to this medal's statute.

Award statute 
The Medal "For Work in Agriculture" is awarded to citizens of the Russian Federation for achievements in the field of agriculture and major contributions to the development of the agro-industrial complex, in training, in research and in other activities aimed at improving the efficiency of agricultural production if previously awarded the honorary title of "Honoured Worker of Agriculture of the Russian Federation".

It may also be awarded to foreign nationals that produce agricultural products on the territory of the Russian Federation, for outstanding achievements in the development of the agro-industrial complex of the Russian Federation.

The order of precedence of the Russian Federation dictates that the Medal "For Work in Agriculture" is to be worn on the left breast with other medals and placed immediately after the Medal For Life Saving.

Award description 
The Medal "For Work in Agriculture" is a 32-millimetre-diameter silver-plated circular medal with raised rims on both the obverse and reverse.  The obverse bears a cross pattée, its four arms enamelled in green, at its center a bare metal medallion bearing the relief State Emblem of the Russian Federation surrounded by a wreath of corn.  On the otherwise plain reverse the inscription in relief "FOR WORK IN AGRICULTURE", below the inscription, "№" in relief with a horizontal line for the award serial number.
    
The medal is suspended by a ring through the award's suspension loop to a standard Russian pentagonal mount covered with a 24-millimetre-wide green silk moiré ribbon with 1.5 mm yellow stripes located 1.5 mm from the edges.

Number of medals awarded 
Below are the numbers of awards per year of the Medal "For Work in Agriculture" compiled from the site of the President of the Russian Federation:

See also 
List of orders, decorations, and medals of the Russian Federation
Russian Ministry of Agriculture

References

External links
The Commission on State Awards to the President of the Russian Federation

Civil awards and decorations of Russia
Orders, decorations, and medals of Russia
Russian awards
Awards established in 2004